The anthem for the Cojedes State, Venezuela, has lyrics by Mauricio Pérez Lazo. The music that accompanies it was composed by Miguel Ángel Granados. The anthem has only one stanza.

See also
 List of anthems of Venezuela

Anthems of Venezuela
Spanish-language songs
Year of song missing